MCE may refer to:

Science and technology
 Maximum considered earthquake or maximum considered event, maximum credible earthquake
 Magnetocaloric effect
 Mass call event, when an event causes an extremely high number of phone calls in an area
 Mass-casualty incident, also called a mass-casualty event (MCE)
 Medicare Code Editor; see Diagnosis-related group

Computing
 Machine-check exception, a type of computer hardware error
 Windows Media Center application, originally part of Windows XP Media Center Edition
 TinyMCE, a Javascript-based HTML editor
 LinuxMCE, Linux Media Center Edition
 Meta-circular evaluator, a type of interpreter

Transportation
 Marina Coastal Expressway, in Singapore
 Merced Regional Airport (IATA airport code), in Merced, California, US
 MetroCentre railway station (National Rail station code), England 
 Mid-cycle enhancement, of an automobile model year

Schools
 Manor Church of England Academy, York, England
 Military College of Engineering (disambiguation)
 Malnad College of Engineering, India

Other uses
 Manually coded English
 Minecraft Earth, a mobile game developed by Mojang Studios
 Missing Children Europe